Ketill Flatnose was a Norse King of the Isles in the 9th century. 

Flatnose may also refer to:
 Morris Oxford flatnose, a series of British cars built 1926–1930
 George Curry (Wild Bunch), robber in the American Old West, nicknamed "Flat-Nose"

See also 

 Flatnose xenocongrid eel
 Flatnose catshark
 Flat-nosed pitviper
 Chapa flat-nosed snake
 Persian cat